Dufferin—Simcoe was a federal electoral district represented in the House of Commons of Canada from 1925 to 1968. It was located in the province of Ontario. This riding was created in 1924 from parts of Dufferin and Simcoe South ridings.

It initially consisted of the county of Dufferin and that part of the county of Simcoe lying south of and including the townships of Tossorontio, Essa and Innisfil. In 1933, it was redefined to exclude the townships of East Luther and East Garafraxa in the county of Dufferin, and no part of the town of Barrie.

In 1947, it was defined as consisting of the county of Dufferin, including the town of Orangeville, but excluding the townships of East Luther and East Garafraxa, and the part of the county of Simcoe lying south of and including the townships of Tosorontio, Essa and Innisfil, and excluding the town of Barrie.

In 1952, it was defined as consisting of the county of Dufferin and the town of Orangeville, and the part of the county of Simcoe lying south of and including the townships of Tosorontio, Essa and Innisfil (excluding the town of Barrie).

The electoral district was abolished in 1966 when it was redistributed between Peel—Dufferin, Simcoe North, Wellington—Grey and York—Simcoe ridings.

Members of Parliament

This riding elected the following members of the House of Commons of Canada:

Election results

|}

|}

|}

|}

On Mr. Rowe's resignation when he accepted nomination for the Ontario Legislature at general election, 28 September 1937:

|}

|}

|}

|}

|}

|}

|}

|}

|}

See also 

 List of Canadian federal electoral districts
 Past Canadian electoral districts

External links 
Riding history from the Library of Parliament

Former federal electoral districts of Ontario